Karem Faride Achach Ramírez (born February 25, 1991) is a Mexican synchronized swimmer. She collected a total of two silver medals each in both the women's duet and team routine at the 2015 Pan American Games in Toronto, and subsequently competed as a member of the Mexican delegation at the Summer Olympics in Rio de Janeiro by the following year. There, she and her London 2012 partner Nuria Diosdado scored 86.0667 to hand the Mexican duo an eleventh spot in the women's duet final with 170.9935 total points.

References

External links 
Rio 2016 Athlete Profile – Mexican Olympic Committee  
FINA Athlete Bio

1991 births
Living people
Mexican synchronized swimmers
Olympic synchronized swimmers of Mexico
Synchronized swimmers at the 2016 Summer Olympics
Sportspeople from Mérida, Yucatán
Synchronized swimmers at the 2015 Pan American Games
Pan American Games medalists in synchronized swimming
Pan American Games silver medalists for Mexico
Synchronized swimmers at the 2017 World Aquatics Championships
Medalists at the 2015 Pan American Games